Famalicão is a parish (freguesia) in the municipality of Guarda in Portugal. The population in 2011 was 615, in an area of 16.02 km2.

References

Freguesias of Guarda, Portugal